Makhan Singh is an Indian athlete. He won a gold medal in Discus throw in the 1951 New Delhi Asian games.

References

Indian male discus throwers
Athletes (track and field) at the 1951 Asian Games
Asian Games medalists in athletics (track and field)
Living people
Asian Games gold medalists for India
Medalists at the 1951 Asian Games
Year of birth missing (living people)